Magarditch Halvadjian is a Bulgarian TV and movie producer and director. He has been involved in directing since 1992.

Early life and education
Magarditch Halvadjian was born on 18 February 1967 in Pleven, Bulgaria of Armenian descent. He graduated from the New Bulgarian University with a master's degree in directing and later taught Directing and Production in TV Show-business at the same university. He later studied in the Moscow Circus School from 1981 to 1986.

Career
In 1996, he established Max Group - 1, associated with the production of the TV shows Crossing Point and Fatal Attraction. In 2002 he founded the production companies Global Films and Global Frame, Open Frames, lineal heir to Global Group.

In 2012 Magarditch Halvadjian and his associates established the Open Frames company, focused on film production. In 2015 the company shot its first movie called Nightworld. The main role in the movie is played by the American actor Jason London and his partner Robert Englund (Freddy Krueger).

The next project for the company is the movie Havana Darkness – shot in the US and Cuba – the first horror movie in history shot in Cuba.

In the fall of 2016 Open Frames produced and shot Welcome to Acapulco. The shooting took place in Acapulco, Mexico and New York, US. The main cast included Michael Madison, William Baldwin and Paul Sorvino.

In the summer of 2017 he shot a short comedy – The Elephone Man, which he wrote and directed. The film was selected by several international film festivals in the US and Europe.

Magarditch Halvadjian was a chairman of the Movie and Television Producers Association from 2009 to 2012.

In 2014, he became co-founder and a member of the management board of the Film Committee Association of Bulgaria. A year later, in 2015 he was honoured with the title "Academic" from the Bulgarian Academy of Science and Art.

In the end of 2016, Magarditch Halvadjian received a "Golden Century" badge of honour from the Ministry of Culture for his outstanding contribution to Bulgarian culture and the development of cultural cooperation.

He was awarded the "Best TV producer" by Darik radio's "Man of the Year".

In the autumn of 2017, Magarditch Halvadjian produced a TV series Suburban Cops, by the original Spanish TV series Los Hombres de Paco. From 2019 he has been the producer of the Bulgarian version of the mystery music show The Masked Singer and the series 'The Road of Honour on Nova TV.

In 2020 and 2021 he has been the producer of the next seasons of Your Face Sounds Familiar, The Masked Singer, and the first season of Rachkov's Forbidden Show.

Personal life 
Magarditch Halvadijan is an activist for the Society and Values Association. They promote conversion therapy and believe that the "transsexual movement is linked with paedophilia". The association also promotes marriage as a union between a man and a woman, as well as promoting traditional family values. They also stand against surrogacy, euthanasia, alcohol, pornography, prostitution and marijuana.

Filmography

Movies
 The Elephone Man – 2017, Short film
 Executive Producer, director and writer
 Genre: Comedy, shot in Bulgaria
 Welcome to Acapulco – 2016, Feature film
 Executive Producer
 Genre: Action/Comedy/Thriller, shot in Mexico
 Havana Darkness – 2016, Feature film
 Executive Producer
 Genre: Thriller, shot in Cuba and US
  Nightworld – 2015, Feature film
 Producer
 Genre: Horror/Thriller, shot in Bulgaria
 Project Bulgaria – 2005
 Producer
 Series of documentaries and commercials (in Bulgarian, English, German, French and Russian), promoting Bulgaria as an attractive tourist destination, created by order of Bulgarian Tourism Authority.
 The Winnings – 2000
 Director and Script-writer
 In 2000 the movie The Winnings was shot with the cooperation of Bulgarian National Television, Boyana Film EAD and Eurofootball. Written and directed by Megerdich Halvadjian

 The premiere of the movie was on Kanal 1 of the Bulgarian National Television in September 2001 and was widely acclaimed by the public and movie critics. The movie “The Winnings” was invited to take part at the prestigious international film festival in Saraevo in 2002 – “Saraevo Film Fest”.
 Farewell, Lilly – 2002
 Directed by Valeri Milev, Producer – Magarditch Halvadjian
 (First prize at the New Bulgarian University Festival and a nomination of Jameson at Sofia Film fest 2003).
 Tingle – 1999
 Director and Script-writer
 Kodak prize at Golden Rose Film Festival, 2000
 Duel – 1996
 Director and Producer – Megerdich Halvadjian 
 Director – Stefan Komandarev
 The Killer Ranger – 1995 
 Director, producer and scriptwriter
 Second prize at the NBU Student Festival
 Madness – 1994
 Director, producer and scriptwriter
 First prize at the NBU Student Festival

TV Series
 The Road of Honor – 2019 – broadcast on NOVA TV   (1 season, 52 episodes) 
 Producer
 Suburban Cops – 2018 – TV series under the original format “Los Hombres de Paco”, broadcast on the national NOVA TV   (1 season, 25 episodes) 
 Producer and director of several episodes 
 Seven Hours Difference – 2011–2013 – TV series, broadcast on the national TV channel bTV   (4 seasons, about 75 episodes)
 Producer of the TV series and director of the pilot
 Sea Salt – 2004 – broadcast on the national NOVA TV   (2 seasons, 47 episodes)
 Producer of the TV series and director of the first episodes

TV Shows 
 Like Two Drops of Water (the Bulgarian version of “Your Face Sounds Familiar” – under a license by Endemol International B.V) – broadcast on the national NOVA TV (9 seasons, 12 or 13 episodes each – 2013, 2014, 2015, 2016, 2017, 2018, 2019, 2020, 2021) 
 Producer and Jury member in seasons 1 and Guest Jury in several episodes during other seasons
 Rachkov's Forbidden Show– broadcast on the national NOVA TV (1 seasons, 13 episodes – 2021) 
 Producer
 The Masked Singer (the Bulgarian version of “The King of Mask Singer” – broadcast on the national NOVA TV (2 seasons, 13 episodes each – 2019, 2020) 
 Producer
 The X Factor – Bulgaria (original format of “Fremantle Media”) – broadcast on the national TV channel NOVA (2013 – season 2; 2014 – season 3; 2015 – season 4; 2017 – season 5). 
 Producer & Member of the jury (season 3)
 I Can See Your Voice – Bulgaria (under the license of CJ E&M and Signal Entertainment Group) – broadcast on the national NOVA TV in fall of 2016, 8 episodes.
 Producer 
 I Can Do That – Bulgaria (original format of Armoza Formats) – broadcast on the national NOVA TV in 2015, 12 episodes.
 Producer 
 The Big Hopes – music show by Global Films, aired in March 2014 on the national NOVA TV, 12 episodes
 Producer 
 All Inclusive – comedy show by “Global Frame”, broadcast on the national NOVA TV in 2013, 10 episodes
 Producer and director
 Bulgaria’s Got Talent – (original format of “Fremantle Media”) – broadcast in 2011 and 2012) on the national TV channel bTV (2 seasons, 57 episodes)
 Producer and jury member
 Complete Madness – comedy show by “Global Frame”, broadcast on the national NOVA TV /previously produced by “Global Vision” and broadcast on NOVA TV in 2009, from September 2009 until April 2012 has been broadcast on bTV. And from September 2012 – 2013 again on NOVA TV/ – 3 seasons, about 120 episodes
 Producer of the format and director of the first episodes 
 Psychic Challenge – Bulgaria (2 seasons, 22 episodes) and “Psychic Challenge” – Romania (original format of “Rdf Rights”) – broadcast on the national TV channel bTV (2008, 2009) and Romanian channel Kanal D
 Executive Producer 
 Fear Factor – Bulgaria (original format of Endemol International B.V.) – broadcast on the national NOVA TV in 2009 (20 episodes)
 Executive Producer 
 The Magnificent Six – broadcast in  2008, 2010 on the national TV channel bTV (2 seasons, about 45 episodes)
 Producer and director
 Extreme Makeover – Bulgaria (original format of ABC) – broadcast on the national NOVA TV in 2007  (40 episodes)
 Executive Producer 
 Star Academy – Bulgaria (original format of Endemol International B.V.) – broadcast on the national NOVA TV in 2005 (about 98 episodes)
 Executive Producer 
 Power of Ten – Bulgaria (original format of CBS) – broadcast on the national NOVA TV in 2008 (11 episodes)
 Producer 
 Show Me the Money – Bulgaria (original format of Endemol International B.V.) – broadcast on TV channel TV7 in 2007 (78 episodes)
 Producer 
 Sea of Love (“All You Need Is Love” – original format of Endemol International B.V.) – broadcast on the national TV channel bTV from 2003 to 2012 (9 seasons, about 480 episodes)
 Producer 
 Lords of the Air– comedy show by “Global Frame”, broadcast on the national NOVA TV /previously produced by “Global Vision” and broadcast on NOVA in 2003–2009, from September 2009 until April 2012 broadcast on bTV. And from September 2012 – 2018 again on NOVA/ – 16 years on air, daily show
 Producer
 You Have Got Mail (C'e Posta Per Te – original format of Maria de Filippi, broadcast on Canale 5 in Italy) – broadcast on the national NOVA TV during 2005–2008 and then again in 2012–2013 (4 seasons, about 170 episodes)
 Producer
 Sweet Revenge (Candid Camera) – broadcast on the national TV channel bTV from 2005 (5 seasons, 204 episodes); Season 6 (4 episodes) aired on NOVA in 2020, but terminated due to the emergency situation with COVID-19.
 Producer and director; producer of Season 6
 Fatal Attraction – broadcast on TV channel MSAT in 2002 (16 episodes)
 Producer and director
 Crossing Point – broadcast on TV channel MSAT from 1999 (3 seasons, about 300 episodes)
 Producer and director
 Russian Roulette (original format of Sony Pictures Television International) – broadcast on Bulgarian National Television in 2003 (about 209 episodes)
 Co-producer

Commercials
He has directed more than 100 commercial spots for products of cosmetic, food and fashion industries, for plenty of alcohol manufacturers, financial and investment institutions. Among the clients are the mobile operators “Mtel” and “Globul”, “UniCredit Bulbank”, “Post Bank”, “DZI Bank”, “Societe Generale Express bank”, “Petrol”, “Allianz” Bulgaria, the chain stores “2Be”, “Domaine Boyar”, “Kamenitza”, “Kraft Foods” Bulgaria, “Nikas-Bulgaria”, “Happy Bar&Grill” restaurants, “Rubella”, “Aroma”, PLC “Doverie”, “Madoc Jeans”, Ministry of Health, etc.

Music videos

He has shot more than 500 music videos for performers from all music styles among which are Slavi Trifonov, Antique, BTR, Signal, Kiril Marichkov, Azis, TE, Milena Slavova, Doni and Momchil, Irra, Akaga, Stoyan Mihalev, Irina Florin, etc.

He has worked for Warner Music Italy as a director of the video of the group Kitchen Funk and for EMI and the German group 666.

In December 2006 Halvadjian shot a video also for the Hollywood star Hilary Duff. The video was broadcast on MTV and it is a part of the soundtrack of the movie Brand Hauser in which Hilary Duff is one of the famous names along with John Cusack, Ben Kingsley and Marisa Tomei.

In August 2008 he took part in the shooting of the new movie of Dolf Lundgren Command Performance. An important scene was given to him, in which during an impressive concert where the Russian President is also present, terrorists invade the place. Magy Halvadjian was chosen to shoot the three musical clips within the film based on his music video experience.

References

Sources 
 http://www.pleven.utre.bg/2015/09/10/338002-magi_halvadzhian_pred_plevenutrebg_za_x_factor_pleven_i_istinata_za_uspeha

External links 

 Global Group website

1967 births
Living people
Bulgarian television producers
Bulgarian film directors
X Factor (Bulgarian TV series)
Bulgarian people of Armenian descent
People from Pleven
New Bulgarian University alumni